On the coloured light of the binary stars and some other stars of the heavens or in the original German  is a treatise by Christian Doppler (1842) in which he postulated his principle that the observed frequency changes if either the source or the observer is moving, which later has been coined the Doppler effect. The original German text can be found in wikisource. The following annotated summary serves as a companion to that original.

Title
The title "" (On the coloured light of the binary stars and some other stars of the heavens - Attempt at a general theory including Bradley's theorem as an integral part) specifies the purpose: describe the hypothesis of the Doppler effect, use it to explain the colours of binary stars, and establish a relation with Bradley's stellar aberration.

Content
§ 1 In which Doppler reminds the readers that light is a wave, and that there is debate as to whether it is a transverse wave, with aether particles oscillating perpendicular to the propagation direction. Proponents claim this is necessary to explain polarised light, whereas opponents object to implications for the aether. Doppler doesn't choose sides, although the issue returns in § 6.

§ 2 Doppler observes that colour is a manifestation of the frequency of the light wave, in the eye of the beholder. He describes his principle that a frequency shift occurs when the source or the observer moves. A ship meets waves at a faster rate when sailing against the waves than when sailing along with them. The same goes for sound and light.

§ 3 Doppler derives his equations for the frequency shift, in two cases:

§ 4 Doppler provides imaginary examples of large and small frequency shifts for sound: 

§ 5 Doppler provides imaginary examples of large and small frequency shifts for light from stars. Velocities are expressed in Meilen/s, and the light speed has a rounded value of 42000 Meilen/s. Doppler assumes that 458 THz (extreme red) and 727 THz (extreme violet) are the borders of the visible spectrum, that the spectrum emitted by stars lies exactly between these borders (except for the infrared stars of § 8), and that the colour of the light emitted by stars is white. 

§ 6 Doppler summarises: 
 The natural colour of stars is white or a weak yellow. 
 A white star approaching with progressive speed would successively turn to green, blue, violet, and invisible (ultraviolet).
 A white star receding with progressive speed would turn to yellow, orange, red, and invisible (infrared).

Doppler wishes that his frequency shift theory will soon be tested by another method to determine the radial velocity of stars. He thinks, without reason, that a confirmation of his theory would imply that light is not a transverse but a longitudinal wave.

§ 7 Doppler argues that his theory applies mainly to binary stars. In his opinion the fixed stars are immobile and white. In a binary star high speeds could be possible due to orbital motion, and binaries appear to be colourful. Doppler divides the binaries in two groups: (1) binary stars of unequal brightness; and (2) binary stars of equal brightness. His interpretation is: in case (1) the brighter star is the heavier one, the weaker star revolves around him; in case (2) both stars revolve around a center of mass in the middle, or around a dark third star. In case (2) the colours are usually complementary. Doppler rules out that the rich complementary colours of binaries are contrast illusions, because an astronomer said he had observed that covering one star does not change the colour impression of the other star. Doppler claims that his theory is supported by the fact that for many binary stars the colour indication in Struve's catalogue is different from that in Herschel's older catalogue, attributing the difference to progress of the orbital motion.

§ 8 Doppler presents two groups of variable stars that in his opinion can be explained as binary stars with Doppler effect. These are the "other stars in the heavens" from the title. 
 Periodic variable stars that are invisible for most of the time, and that brighten up with a red colour for a short while once per cycle. In Doppler's opinion they are binary stars. Such a star is usually invisible because it emits infrared instead of white light. In the orbit section with the maximal radial speed in the direction of Earth, the observed frequency on Earth is shifted from infrared to visible red.
 'New stars' (in particular two supernovas, Tycho's Nova of 1572, and Kepler's Nova of 1604), that suddenly appeared, having a white colour in the brightest phase, then turning to yellow and red, and finally fading out. According to Doppler they too are binary stars, with extremely high speed and long period. Doppler assumes Sirius, the brightest star in the sky, belongs to this group, because some texts from antiquity say its colour was red, instead of its current white colour.

§ 9 Doppler notes that the orbital speed of the Earth (4.7 Meilen/s) is too low (<33 Meilen/s) to result in visually perceptible colour changes. He identifies two factors that may lead to high orbital speeds in a binary star:
 Central star far heavier than the Sun. According to Doppler stars that are a million times heavier than the Sun are plausible.
 Highly elliptical orbit with a small perihelium distance (<1 AU).

Doppler assumes that there are binary stars with a perihelium speed larger than the speed of light. The astronomer Littrow would have suggested that the perihelium speed of the visual binary star γ Virgo is nearly equal to the speed of light.

§ 10 Doppler summarises the above, and concludes that his speculations explain so much that his theory has to be true. He shares a few more speculations:
 The colours of binary stars are not static, they will change periodically in phase with the orbital motion.
 The stars of § 8, which suddenly (in just a few hours time) appear, then gradually extinguish and remain invisible for many years, are binary stars with a highly elliptical orbit and a high perihelium speed. If the Earth sees the orbit obliquely, such a star may appear faster than it disappears. 
 Fluctuations in the period of variable stars like Mira (according to Doppler its period varies between 328 and 335 days), result from the orbital motion of the Earth.

§ 11 Conclusion: Doppler expects his frequency shift theory will be accepted, because similar aberrations that depend on v/c (Rømer's and Bradley's) have been accepted before. Doppler waits for the experts to decide if his speculations will do as evidence. He is convinced that finally his principle will be used for the determination of the speed of remote stars.

Notes

See also
 Full text on archive.org.
  Abhandlundgen von Christian Doppler, herausgegeben von H.A. Lorentz (1907). In the final chapter Lorentz comments on Über das farbige Licht.

Doppler effects
Wave mechanics